Crawford County Community School Corporation is a school district headquartered in Marengo, Indiana.

Schools
 Crawford County High School
  Crawford County Middle School
 East Crawford Elementary School
 South Crawford Elementary School
 West Crawford Elementary School

References

External links
 Crawford County Community Schools

School districts in Indiana
Crawford County, Indiana